Alan William Reid (born June 14, 1962) is a Scottish-American mathematician working primarily with arithmetic hyperbolic 3-manifolds. 
He is  the Edgar Odell Lovett Chair of mathematics at  Rice University, 2017—present.

Biography

Reid grew up in Buckie, Scotland. He obtained his doctorate from the University of Aberdeen, supervised by Colin Maclachlan, on the topic of Arithmetic Kleinian Groups and their Fuchsian Subgroups. He was a Royal Society University Research Fellow at Cambridge 1992-96.

Research

Alan Reid's research primarily focusses on low-dimensional topology, hyperbolic manifolds and profinite groups. He proved that the figure-eight knot is the only knot whose complement is an arithmetic hyperbolic 3-manifold.  With Martin Bridson, Ben McReynolds and Ryan Spitler, he found the first examples of non-elementary Kleinian groups which are determined by their finite quotients among finitely generated residually finite groups.

Notable publications

  with Colin Maclachlan.

Awards and honours

 Speaker at the 2018 International Congress of Mathematicians, Rio de Janeiro.
 In 2013 he became one of the (inaugural) Fellows of the American Mathematical Society.
 Pennzoil Company Regents Professor of Mathematics, University of Texas, Austin, 2011–2016.
 Sir Edmund Whittaker Prize in 1993.

References

External links
 

20th-century Scottish mathematicians
21st-century Scottish mathematicians
Topologists
Rice University faculty
Alumni of the University of Aberdeen
Living people
University of Texas at Austin faculty
Scottish expatriates in the United States
Fellows of the American Mathematical Society
People from Buckie
1962 births